Johan Eriksson may refer to:

Johan Eriksson (canoeist) (born 1978), Swedish sprint canoeist
Johan Eriksson (ice hockey) (born 1993), Swedish ice hockey player
Johan Eriksson, contestant on Idol (Norway season 6)
Johan Eriksson, inventor of Autoclaved aerated concrete
Johan Eriksson, Swedish Snocross racer

See also
 Johan Erikson, ski jumper